Dolores Keane (born 26 September 1953) is an Irish folk singer and occasional actress. She was a founding member of the group De Dannan and has since embarked on a solo career.

Background
Keane was born in a small village called Sylane (near Tuam) in rural County Galway in the west of Ireland. From the age of four she was raised by her aunts Rita and Sarah Keane, also well-known sean-nós singers. Keane started her singing at a very young age, due to the influence of her musical aunts. She made her first recording for Radio Éireann in 1958, at the age of five. This early start inevitably meant that Keane would have a career in music. Her brother, Seán, also went on to enjoy a successful music career.

Musical career

De Dannan

In 1975, she co-founded the traditional Irish band De Dannan, and they released their debut album Dé Danann in that same year. The group gained international recognition and enjoyed major success in the late 1970s in the US. Keane went touring with the band and their single "The Rambling Irishman" was a big hit in Ireland. In early 1976, after a short two-year spell, Keane left De Dannan and was replaced by Andy Irvine, who recorded live with the band on 30 April 1976, during the Third Irish Folk Festival in Germany. Soon thereafter, she married multi-instrumentalist John Faulkner, with whom she would subsequently record three albums of folk music.

Solo career
Keane lived and worked in London for several years with Faulkner, before they moved to Ireland in the early 1980s. They worked on a series of film scores and programmes for the BBC and formed two successful bands, The Reel Union and Kinvara. During this period Keane recorded her first solo album, There Was a Maid in 1978. This was followed by two other releases, Broken Hearted I'll Wander (1979) and Farewell to Eirinn (1980), which gave credit to Faulkner. In the mid-1980s, she rejoined De Dannan and recorded the albums Anthem and Ballroom with them.

Keane turned her attention, once again, to her solo career in 1988. It saw the release of the eponymous Dolores Keane album. Her follow-up album A Lion in a Cage, which was released in 1989, featured a song written by Faulkner called "Lion in a Cage", protesting the imprisonment of Nelson Mandela. It became Keane's first Irish number-one single, and she performed the hit at the celebration of his release. This exposure expanded Keane's reputation and popularity worldwide. A new facet was added to Dolores' career when she played the female lead in the Dublin production of Brendan Behan's The Hostage, a new translation by Niall Tóibín and Michael Scott, the opening night of which was attended by Mary Robinson, the President of Ireland at the time.

In 1992, Keane was among the many female Irish singers to lend their music to the record-smashing anthology A Woman's Heart. The album, which also featured Eleanor McEvoy, Mary Black, Frances Black, Sharon Shannon and Maura O'Connell, went on to become the biggest-selling album in Irish history. A Woman's Heart Vol. 2 was released in late 1994 and emulated its predecessor in album charts the world over.  Also in 1994, a solo album, entitled Solid Ground, was released on the Shanachie label (available on Dara Records) and received critical acclaim in Europe and America.

In August 1995, Keane was awarded the prestigious 'Fiddler's Green Hall of Fame' award in Rostrevor, County Down, for her "significant contribution to the cause of Irish music and culture". In that same year, she took to the stage in the Dublin production of JM Synge's Playboy of the Western World. Dolores contributed to the RTÉ/BBC television production Bringing It All Back Home (1991), a series of programmes illustrating the movement of Irish music to America. Keane was shown performing both in Nashville, Tennessee with musicians such as Emmylou Harris and Richard Thompson, and at home in Galway with her aunts Rita and Sarah.

In August 1997, Keane went to number one again in the Irish albums chart with a compilation album of her most loved songs. Another studio album was released by Keane in 1998, called Night Owl. It saw Keane returning to her traditional Irish roots and it did well in Europe and America. Despite a healthy solo career, Keane went on tour with De Dannan again in the late 1990s, where she played to packed audiences in venues such as Birmingham, Alabama and New York City.

Keane has not released a solo album since 1998, stating that she wanted to take a hard-earned break after twenty-five years of relentless touring.

Musical legacy
Keane is known the world over for her deep, melodic voice. Her recordings of songs such as Dougie MacLean's "Caledonia", Frank A. Fahey's "Galway Bay", Paul Brady's "The Island", and Donagh Long's "Never Be the Sun" are regarded as amongst the greatest interpretations of these songs. American singer Nanci Griffith said of Keane: "Dolores Keane, the queen of the soul of Ireland, has a sacred voice.".

Personal life
Keane married musician John Faulkner, with whom she had worked on many occasions, in 1977. After a difficult pregnancy, Keane gave birth to their first child, Joseph. He was born with Bardet–Biedl syndrome, which causes obesity and failing vision. Dolores and John's marriage ended in 1988.  Her current partner is Barry "Bazza" Farmer, with whom she had her second child, Tara, born in 1994. Keane put an end to recording and touring in the late 1990s, due to depression and alcoholism. She has received extensive treatment for these conditions. As of 2007, Keane lives outside Galway with her two children and her husband Barry. As of June 2014, Keane was given the all clear after developing cancer.

Discography
There Was a Maid (1978)
Dolores Keane (1988)
Lion in a Cage (1989)
Solid Ground (1993)
Night Owl (1998) Alula Records

Dé Danann / De Dannan
De Danann (1975)
Anthem (1985)
Ballroom (1988)

Dolores Keane and John Faulkner
Broken Hearted I'll Wander (1979)
Farewell to Éirinn (1980)
Sail Óg Rua (1983)

Rita Eriksen and Dolores Keane
Tideland (1996) Alula Records

Compilations
Best of Dolores Keane (1997)
Where Have All the Flowers Gone: The Very Best of Dolores Keane (2003)

John Prine and others
In Spite of Ourselves (1999) Oh Boy Records
Dolores duets with John on "It's a Cheating Situation" and "In a Town This Size".

Anthologies
A Woman's Heart (1992)
A Woman's Heart 2 (1994)
Bringing It All Back Home – Influence of Irish Music (2 CDs) (2000)

Video (VHS)
Bringing It All Back Home – Influence of Irish Music (1992) (various artists)

References

External links
 
 [ allmusic.com biography]

1953 births
Living people
Irish women singers
Irish folk singers
Irish-language singers
Musicians from County Galway
People from County Galway
De Dannan members
Shanachie Records artists
Claddagh Records artists